The Lofer Mountains or Loferer Mountains (lit. "Lofer Rock Mountains") are a mountain range in the Northern Limestone Alps in the Eastern Alps of central Europe. They are located in Austria in the federal states of Tyrol and Salzburg.

Summits in the Lofer Mountains 
 Ulrichshorn 
 Großes Ochsenhorn 
 Mitterhorn (Großes Hinterhorn) 
 Großes Reifhorn 
 Breithorn 
 Großes Rothorn 
 Rothörnl 
 Geislhörner 
 Seehorn 
 Zwölferhörnl

Valley settlements 
 Waidring
 Sankt Ulrich am Pillersee
 Hochfilzen
 Lofer
 Sankt Martin bei Lofer
 Weißbach bei Lofer

Neighbouring mountain ranges 
The Lofer Mountains border on the following other mountain ranges in the Alps:
 Chiemgau Alps (to the north)
 Berchtesgaden Alps (to the east)
 Leoganger Steinberge (to the southeast)
 Kitzbühel Alps (to the southwest)
 Kaisergebirge (to the west)

Photos

References

External links 

Homepage of the Schmidt Zabierow Hut
Description at SummitPost (English)

 
Mountain ranges of the Alps
Northern Limestone Alps
Mountain ranges of Salzburg (state)
Mountain ranges of Tyrol (state)